Tolhurst may refer to:

 George Tolhurst (1827–1877), English composer a 19th-century English composer
 Jeremiah Tolhurst (1615–1671), English Civil War soldier, businessman and politician who sat in the House of Commons between 1654 and 1660
 John Tolhurst  (born 1943), British Rear Admiral and a former Royal Navy officer 
 Kelly Tolhurst (born 1978), English Conservative Party politician, Member of Parliament (MP) for Rochester and Strood since 2015
 Kerryn Tolhurst, Australian musician and songwriter
 Lol Tolhurst (born 1959), founding member of the UK rock band, The Cure
 Rhys Tolhurst, Australian singer-songwriter
 Stan Tolhurst, Australian actor
 William Tolhurst (1931–2013), New Zealand chartered accountant and member of parliament